Michele Paolucci (born 6 February 1986) is an Italian footballer who plays as a forward for Canadian club FC Manitoba.

Club career

Juventus and loans
Paolucci came through the ranks at Juventus. After graduating from their Primavera youth team. However, despite being called up to the first team he never made an official Serie A appearance for the Old Lady. He played with Sebastian Giovinco and Claudio Marchisio.

In 2006–07 season he was loaned to Ascoli, made his team and Serie A debut on 10 September 2006, against Atalanta. After his successful spell at Ascoli where he would go on to score 6 goals in 32 Serie A appearances, he returned shortly to Juventus.

Udinese and loans
In mid-2007, he moved to Udinese on a co-ownership deal, as part of the Juventus's deal to sign Vincenzo Iaquinta. The price tag of Paolucci's 50% registration rights, was €1.355 million at that time. He made his official game debut in the Italian Cup, scored two goals against Bari on 29 August 2007. He made just 2 appearances in 5 months at Udinese.

In January 2008 Juventus and Udinese loaned him out to Atalanta, where he would play until 30 June 2008.

In June 2008, Juventus and Udinese again loaned Paolucci out, this time to Sicilian club, Catania. He scored 7 goals that season, in the Serie A and had been regularly included in first team action, under coach Walter Zenga. He made a total of 28 starts for the club.

Siena and loans
In June 2009, Paolucci returned to Udinese, but was immediately bought back fully by Juventus for €3.3 million. On 8 July 2009 he joined Siena on a co-ownership for the same price. He signed a 5-year contract. Paolucci did not manage to hold down a regular starting place at Siena, making just 10 Serie A appearances, and scoring just twice.

After not obtaining a regular starting place and also due to Juventus' striker injury crisis, he was loan back by Juventus on 16 January 2010, by Juve paying Siena €500,000. Originally acquired as addition to an injury-ridden team, Paolucci never broke into the first team and ended his second Juve stint with only four league appearances before to return to Siena, now relegated to Serie B.

After a disappointing period at Siena, with only one second-division appearance with the Tuscans, Paolucci accepted a loan move to Palermo on 31 January 2011, replacing the left of former Siena teammate Massimo Maccarone. He made his debut with the Sicilians only two days later, replacing Fabrizio Miccoli in the final minutes of a home game against his former team Juventus, ended in a 2–1 win for Palermo. Siena elected to loan him out once again to Vicenza for the 2011–12 season after the club acquired the residual 50% rights from Juve for free.

Latina
On 28 January 2014, Paolucci left Siena for Serie B side Latina, signed a four-and-a-half-year contract. In 2015, he was released by Latina.

Petrolul
On 9 December 2015, Paolucci signed a six-month contract with Romanian side Petrolul, with an option to extend it by a further year.

Catania and Ancona
In July 2016 he returned to Italy and moved to Catania; in January 2017 it was sold to Ancona.

Monopoli and Floriana
Paolucci joined Italian side Monopoli in mid-2017, and then Maltese side Floriana on 18 January 2018.

Valour FC
On 16 July 2019, Paolucci signed with Canadian Premier League side Valour FC.

FC Manitoba
On 10 September 2020, Paolucci signed with USL League Two side FC Manitoba as a player and assistant manager.

International career
Paolucci made his U-21 team debut against Luxembourg U-21, 12 December 2006, replacing Nicola Pozzi at half time.

Career statistics

References

External links
 FIGC 
 Profile at gazzetta.it 
 

Living people
1986 births
Association football forwards
Italian footballers
People from Recanati
Italian expatriate footballers
Expatriate footballers in Romania
Italian expatriate sportspeople in Romania
Expatriate footballers in Malta
Italian expatriate sportspeople in Malta
Expatriate soccer players in Canada
Italian expatriate sportspeople in Canada
Juventus F.C. players
Ascoli Calcio 1898 F.C. players
Udinese Calcio players
Atalanta B.C. players
Catania S.S.D. players
A.C.N. Siena 1904 players
Palermo F.C. players
L.R. Vicenza players
Latina Calcio 1932 players
FC Petrolul Ploiești players
U.S. Ancona 1905 players
S.S. Monopoli 1966 players
Floriana F.C. players
Tarxien Rainbows F.C. players
Valour FC players
FC Manitoba players
Serie A players
Serie B players
Liga I players
Serie C players
USL League Two players
Maltese Premier League players
Canadian Premier League players
Italy youth international footballers
Italy under-21 international footballers
Sportspeople from the Province of Macerata
Footballers from Marche